Elisabeth Wesmael (1861–1953) was a Belgian graphic artist.

Life 
Wesmael studied at the Academie van Bergen under Auguste Danse from 1883 till 1884, where she learned to draw and make etchings by copying pictures such as "Sparrenbos in de Kempen" by Joseph Coosemans (1828–1904) and "Het uitgaan van de Vespers" by Franz Courtens (1854–1943), both in the collection of the museum in Brussels. Later she switched to landscapes, mostly of the Ardennes ("De Samber te Thuin", "Thuin. La ville basse", "Touët de Beuil",  "De Ourthe te Esneux"...).
Her etching Sunset in the Campine after Coosemans, was included in the 1905 book Women Painters of the World.
Her drawings also consist mostly of landscapes : "A corner of Léon Souguenet's garden", "Plateau de l'Ourthe"...

Wesmael was a member of the artist societies L'Estampe and Société des Aquafortistes Belges.

She married the writer Maurice des Ombiaux (1868–1943) and was friends with Louise Danse, her teacher Auguste Danse's daughter, who was also a graphic artist.

Exhibitions 
 1907, Brussel, Salon 1907
 1910, Brussel, L'Estampe. 4de Salon

References

Literature 
 J. Ensor (ed. X. Tricot), Lettres, Brussel (Labor), 1999.
 E. Gubin (e.a.), Dictionnaire des femmes belges XIXe et XXe siècles, Brussel, 2006.

1861 births
1953 deaths
Belgian printmakers
19th-century Belgian women artists
20th-century Belgian women artists
Belgian graphic designers
Women graphic designers
Women printmakers